Mukhorshibirsky District (Mukhar Sheberei aimag) is an administrative and municipal district (raion), one of the twenty-one in the Republic of Buryatia, Russia. It is located in the center of the republic. Its administrative center is the rural locality (a selo) of Mukhorshibir. As of the 2010 Census, the total population of the district was 24,969, with the population of Mukhorshibir accounting for 20.9% of that number.

History
The district was established on September 26, 1927 from the territory of Verkhneudinsky Uyezd.

Administrative and municipal status
Within the framework of administrative divisions, Mukhorshibirsky District is one of the twenty-one in the Republic of Buryatia. The district is divided into thirteen selsoviets and three somons, which comprise twenty-nine rural localities. As a municipal division, the district is incorporated as Mukhorshibirsky Municipal District. Its thirteen selsoviets and three somons are incorporated as sixteen rural settlements within the municipal district. The selo of Mukhorshibir serves as the administrative center of both the administrative and municipal district.

Галерея 
Landscapes of Mukhorshibir district

References

Notes

Sources

Districts of Buryatia
States and territories established in 1927
 
